Calvino is an Italian surname. Notable people with the surname include:
 Italo Calvino, Italian journalist and writer
 Jo Calvino, British weightlifter
 Vincent Calvino, fictional character
 (1909–1956), Italian journalist, screenwriter and writer

See also
 Calviño

Italian-language surnames